This is a list of original downloadable games on the Wii video game console that are downloaded from the WiiWare section of the Wii Shop Channel in North America. There are currently 352 titles released in this region. These games can also be played on the Wii U through Wii Mode.

It was announced on September 29, 2017 that Nintendo planned to discontinue the Wii Shop Channel by January 31, 2019, with the purchase of Wii Points for new games being discontinued on March 26, 2018. Since the discontinuation of the Wii Shop Channel on January 31, 2019, WiiWare titles are no longer purchasable or downloadable, though games already downloaded can still be played. These games are now declared lost due to no availability of these games in the Nintendo eShop. Yet, some games, such as Mega Man 9 and Sonic the Hedgehog 4: Episode I, have survived on other formats, like App Store and Nintendo Switch.

List of downloadable games

Downloadable games for Club Nintendo members
These games were available exclusively for members of Club Nintendo, Nintendo's previous customer loyalty program, in the United States and Canada. There are currently 2 titles released in this region. Club Nintendo has since been replaced by My Nintendo.

See also
 List of WiiWare games
 List of WiiWare games (PAL region)
 List of Wii games
 Lists of Virtual Console games
 List of Virtual Console games for Wii (North America)
 List of DSiWare games and applications
 List of DSiWare games (North America)
 List of Nintendo 3DS games
 List of Wii U software

References

External links
 Nintendo of Japan's WiiWare page
 Nintendo of America's WiiWare Page
 Hudson Entertainment Games for WiiWare

WiiWare

fr:Liste de jeux WiiWare
ja:Wiiウェアのゲームタイトル一覧
pt:Anexo:Lista de jogos do WiiWare
zh:WiiWare遊戲列表